The eelpouts are the ray-finned fish family Zoarcidae. As the common name suggests, they are somewhat eel-like in appearance. All of the roughly 300 species are marine and mostly bottom-dwelling, some at great depths. Eelpouts are predominantly found in the Northern Hemisphere. The arctic, north pacific and north Atlantic oceans have the highest concentration of species, however species are found around the globe. 

They are conventionally placed in the "perciform" assemblage; in fact, the Zoarcoidei seem to be specialized members of the Gasterosteiformes-Scorpaeniformes group of Acanthopterygii.

The largest member of the family is Zoarces americanus, which may reach 1.1 m in length. Other notable genera include Lycodapus and Gymnelus.

Taxonomy
The eelpout family was first proposed as the family Zoarchidae in 1839 by the English naturalist William John Swainson but the spelling was changed to Zoarcidae after the spelling of the genus Zoarces was corrected by Theodore Gill in 1861. The 5th edition of Fishes of the World classifies this family within the suborder Zoarcoidei, within the order Scorpaeniformes. Other authorities classify this family in the infraorder Zoarcales wihin the suborder Cottoidei of the Perciformes because removing the Scorpaeniformes from the Perciformes renders that taxon non monophyletic.

Fishes of the World mentions four subfamilies but does not assign genera to the subfamilies but these were set out in Anderson and Federov's Annotated Checklist and this has been followed by FishBase and Catalog of Fishes.

Subfamilies and genera
The eelpouts are classified into four subfamilies and 61 genera with around 300 species:

 

 subfamily Gymnelinae Gill, 1863
 Andriashevia Fedorov & Neelov, 1978
 Barbapellis Iglésias, Dettai & Ozouf-Costaz, 2012
 Bilabria Schmidt, 1936
 Davidijordania Popov, 1931
 Ericandersonia Shinohara & Sakurai, 2006
 Gymnelopsis Soldatov, 1922
 Gymnelus Reinhardt 1834
 Hadropareia Schmidt, 1904
 Krusensterniella Schmidt, 1904
 Magadanichthys Shinohara, Nazarkin & Chereshnev, 2006
 Melanostigma Günther, 1881
 Nalbantichthys Schultz, 1967
 Opaeophacus Bond & Stein, 1984
 Puzanovia Fedorov, 1975
 Seleniolycus Anderson, 1988
 subfamily Lycodinae Gill, 1861
 Aiakas Gosztonyi, 1977
 Argentinolycus Matallanas & Corbella, 2012
 Austrolycus Regan, 1913
 Bellingshausenia Matallanas, 2009
 Bentartia Matallanas, 2010
 Bothrocara Bean, 1890
 Bothrocarina Suvorov, 1935
 Crossostomus Lahille, 1908
 Dadyanos Whitley, 1951
 Derepodichthys Gilbert, 1896
 Dieidolycus Anderson, 1988
 Eucryphycus Anderson, 1988
 Exechodontes DeWitt, 1977
 Gosztonyia Matallanas, 2009
 Hadropogonichthys Fedorov, 1982
 Iluocoetes Jenyns, 1842
 Japonolycodes Shinohara, Sakurai & Machida, 2002
 Letholycus Anderson, 1988
 Lycenchelys Gill, 1884
 Lycodapus Gilbert, 1890
 Lycodes Reinhardt, 1831
 Lycodichthys Pappenheim, 1911
 Lycodonus Goode & Bean, 1883
 Lycogrammoides Soldatov & Lindberg, 1928
 Lyconema Gilbert, 1896
 Maynea Cunningham, 1871
 Notolycodes Gosztonyi, 1977
 Oidiphorus McAllister & Rees 1964
 Ophthalmolycus Regan, 1913
 Pachycara Zugmayer. 1911
 Patagolycus Matallanas & Corbella, 2012
 Petroschmidtia Taranetz & Andriashev, 1934
 Phucocoetes Jenyns, 1842
 Piedrabuenia Gosztonyi, 1977
 Plesienchelys Anderson, 1988
 Pogonolycus Norman, 1937
 Pyrolycus Machida & Hashimoto, 2002
 Santelmoa Matallanas, 2010
 Taranetzella Andriashev, 1952
 Thermarces Rosenblatt & Cohen, 1986
 Zestichthys Jordan & Hubbs, 1925
 subfamily Lycozarcinae  Andriashev, 1939
 Lycozoarces Popov, 1935
 subfamily Zoarcinae Swainson, 1839
 Zoarces Cuvier 1829

Characteristics 
The body of eelpouts is relatively elongated and laterally compressed. Their heads are relatively small and ovoid. Juveniles have a more rounded snout and relatively larger eye than adults. Their scales are absent or very small.  The dorsal and anal fins are continuous down their bodies up to their caudal fin. They produce the pigment vivianite, which turns their bones green. This feature has no apparent evolutionary function and is harmless. Overall, there is no sexual dimorphism.

Biology 
Little is known about eelpout populations because they often slip through nets in sampling studies, and because some species live in inaccessibly deep habitats. Species for which trophic ecology has been documented are typically, if not always, benthic scavengers or predators. At least one species has also adapted to able to breathe air when out of water.

Timeline

References

Ray-finned fish families